Narowal Junction railway station is located in Narowal city, Narowal district of Punjab province of the Pakistan. Now Narowal-Dera Baba Nanak railway line had been permanently closed from 1999 due to aftermath of 1999 Kargil War. The Jassar-Chak Amru railway line is in bad shape now and no passenger service is operated currently.

History
The railway station was constructed in 1927.

In 2017, the railway station was rescontructed and a new building was inaugurated in 2018.

See also
 List of railway stations in Pakistan
 Pakistan Railways

References

Railway stations in Narowal district
Railway stations on Wazirabad–Narowal Branch Line
Railway stations on Shahdara Bagh–Chak Amru Branch Line
1927 establishments in British India